Joanne Claire Wilkes is a New Zealand professor of English literature.

Academic career
Wilkes did an undergraduate degree at the University of Sydney and a DPhil at the University of Oxford in 1984. She then taught at Monash University in Melbourne and then the University of Auckland. She became a professor in 2013. She specialises in women writers whose recognition has faded.

Selected works
 Lord Byron and Madame de Staël born for opposition
 Women reviewing women in nineteenth-century Britain the critical reception of Jane Austen, Charlotte Brontë and George Eliot
 The works of Elizabeth Gaskell

References

External links
 Institutional homepage
 Full text of doctoral thesis via Oxford Research Archive

Alumni of the University of Oxford
University of Sydney alumni
Academic staff of Monash University
Academic staff of the University of Auckland
Living people
1956 births